
Paraleptamphopus is a genus of amphipods in the family Paraleptamphopidae endemic to New Zealand. The first species to be described was Calliope subterraneus (now Paraleptamphopus subterraneus) which was named by Charles Chilton in 1882. George M. Thomson described a second species in 1885, as Pherusa coerulea (now Paraleptamphopus caeruleus). Although no other species have yet been formally described, it is thought that many more undescribed species exist.

Paraleptamphopus subterraneus
In 1882, Charles Chilton collected specimens of P. subterraneus from groundwater at his farm near Eyreton, Canterbury, and later obtained specimens from various depths in Lincoln, Winchester and St. Albans. These animals were colourless and lacked eyes, and were described as a new species in the genus Calliope. Chilton later acquired specimens from the Porter River at Castle Hill, Canterbury, from Lake Wakatipu, Otago, from Lake Taupō on the North Island and from Otautau, Southland.

Paraleptamphopus caeruleus
Further populations were not found for several years, but were later discovered at a variety of locations, including "the bog-water on top of Swampy Hill, near Dunedin", Otautau (together with P. subterraneus), Ruapuke Island, Drummond, and near Invercargill. Unlike P. subterraneus, P. caeruleus is a deep blue colour, which it retains even after prolonged preservation. Chilton concluded that P. caeruleus was the form from which P. subterraneus evolved.

Undescribed species
More recent work has unearthed a great deal of genetic variability within the specimens ascribed to the genus, which is likely to result in the description of a number of new species. The centre of diversity is in the upper West Coast of the South Island, and the genus appears to be absent from the eastern portion of the North Island, (the Bay of Plenty, East Cape, and northern Hawke's Bay), presumably due to a recent history of volcanism.

References

Gammaridea
Freshwater crustaceans of New Zealand
Taxa named by Thomas Roscoe Rede Stebbing